William Ambrose Wright (January 19, 1844 – September 13, 1929) was a lieutenant in the Confederate States Army, and Georgia state comptroller for fifty years, as well as insurance commissioner.

Biography

William Ambrose Wright was born in Louisville, Georgia on January 19, 1844.

He enlisted in the Confederate States Army in 1860. During the Civil War, he was wounded at the Second Battle of Bull Run, resulting in the amputation of his right leg. He was captured and imprisoned at Johnson's Island from June 1863 until May 1864.

Wright was appointed comptroller general of Georgia by Governor Alfred H. Colquitt on September 17, 1879.

He remained in office until his death in Atlanta on September 13, 1929. He was buried at Oakland Cemetery.

References

External links
 – marker at the Georgia State Capitol

1844 births
1929 deaths
Confederate States Army officers
Comptrollers in the United States
Burials at Oakland Cemetery (Atlanta)
People from Louisville, Georgia
State insurance commissioners of the United States